Panna Rittikrai or birth name Krittiya Lardphanna (February 17, 1961 – July 20, 2014) was a Thai martial arts action choreographer, film director, screenwriter, and actor. The head of the Muay Thai Stunt team (previously known as P.P.N. Stunt Team), he is best known for his work as a martial arts and action choreographer on the 2003 film Ong-Bak: Muay Thai Warrior and 2005's Tom-Yum-Goong (known as The Protector in the US), starring Tony Jaa, whom Panna mentored.

Biography

Early films
"You've probably never heard of my movies," Panna told the Bangkok Post in a 2004 interview. "They are popular among taxi drivers and som tam vendors and security guards and Isan coolies. My loyalest fans are folk people in the far-out tambons, where they lay out mattresses on the ground and drink moonshine whisky while watching my outdoor movies."

Born  in Khon Kaen Province, Thailand, Panna started out in the movie business in 1979 as a physical trainer for actors in Bangkok. Learning a little about filmmaking and inspired by the movies of Jackie Chan and Bruce Lee, as well as stunts seen in James Bond movies, Panna moved back to Khon Kaen and formed his own stunt team, the P.P.N. Stunt Team (actually known as Muay Thai Stunt) and set about making films.

His first was Gerd ma lui (Born to Fight), which he remade in 2004.

International fame
With the worldwide releases of Ong-Bak and Tom-Yum-Goong, with their gritty, hard-hitting stunts, action-film fans the world over have wanted to see more, so film distributors are starting to release some of Panna's older titles on DVDs geared for the international market. Among the films finding new life on the home video market are Spirited Killer, or Puen Hode, co-starring Tony Jaa, as well as Mission Hunter 2, in which Jaa portrays a villain.

Panna's martial-arts choreography work also can be seen in the action-comedy, The Bodyguard, which starred and was directed by Thai comic actor Petchtai Wongkamlao. Recent and upcoming projects include Mercury Man, a Thai superhero film in which he coordinated the martial arts; the sequel to Ong-Bak, Ong Bak 2; and Chocolate, a film directed by Prachya Pinkaew starring a female martial artist, Yanin Vismistananda. He co-starred in Dynamite Warrior, a 2006 martial-arts action comedy set in 19th century Siam and starring Dan Chupong from Born to Fight. It was Panna's first acting role in 9 years.

Death
Panna Rittikrai had been receiving treatment for liver disease since November 2013. Rittikrai died in a hospital in Bangkok from complications brought on by acute liver and kidney failure on July 20, 2014. It was also later discovered that he had a brain tumor.

Main filmography

Actor

Crew

References

External links

1961 births
Panna Rittikrai
Panna Rittikrai
Panna Rittikrai
Panna Rittikrai
2014 deaths
Panna Rittikrai
Action choreographers
Deaths from liver failure
Deaths from kidney failure